Minor is a surname shared by several notable people:

 Benjamin Blake Minor (1818-1905), American educator and writer
 Charles Landon Carter Minor (1835-1903), American educator
 Claudie Minor (born 1951), American professional football player 
 Edward S. Minor (1840-1924), American politician
 Ethel Minor (born 1922), American civil rights activist
 George Minor (1845-1904), American composer
 Halsey Minor (born 1964), American technology entrepreneur
 John B. Minor (1813-1895), American law professor
 Robert Minor (1882-1952), American cartoonist and radical
 Robert Crannell Minor (1839-1904), American artist
 Robert Lee Minor (born 1944), American actor and stuntman
 Shane Minor (born 1968), American country music singer-songwriter
 Virginia Minor (1824-1894), American women's suffrage activist
 William Chester Minor (1834–1920), American surgeon; contributor to the Oxford English Dictionary
 Wilma Frances Minor, American novelist, short story writer and biographer.